Kashanak (also Romanized as Kashānak and Keshānak; also known as Golzār) is a village in Almeh Rural District, Samalqan District, Maneh and Samalqan County, North Khorasan Province, Iran. At the 2006 census, its population was 2,574, in 712 families.

References 

Populated places in Maneh and Samalqan County